Biari is a town, and one of twenty union councils in Battagram District in Khyber-Pakhtunkhwa province of Pakistan. It is located at 34°38'30N 73°24'0E and has an altitude of 1904 metres (6249 feet).

References

External links 

Union councils of Battagram District
Populated places in Battagram District